Conus gauguini, common name Gauguin's cone, is a species of sea snail, a marine gastropod mollusk in the family Conidae, the cone snails and their allies.

Like all species within the genus Conus, these snails are predatory and venomous. They are capable of "stinging" humans, therefore live ones should be handled carefully or not at all.

Description
The size of an adult shell varies between 56 mm and 93 mm.

Distribution
This species occurs in the Pacific Ocean along the Marquesas and Tahiti.

References

 Richard, G. & Salvat, F., 1973. Conus (Dendroconus) gauguini sp. n. (Neogastropoda: Conidae) des îles Marquises (Polynésie française). Cahiers du Pacifique 17: 25–29
 Filmer R.M. (2001). A Catalogue of Nomenclature and Taxonomy in the Living Conidae 1758 – 1998. Backhuys Publishers, Leiden. 388pp.
 Tucker J.K. (2009). Recent cone species database. September 4, 2009 Edition
 Tucker J.K. & Tenorio M.J. (2009) Systematic classification of Recent and fossil conoidean gastropods. Hackenheim: Conchbooks. 296 pp
 Puillandre N., Duda T.F., Meyer C., Olivera B.M. & Bouchet P. (2015). One, four or 100 genera? A new classification of the cone snails. Journal of Molluscan Studies. 81: 1–23

External links
 The Conus Biodiversity website
 
 Cone Shells – Knights of the Sea
 Holotype in MNHN, Paris

gauguini
Gastropods described in 1973